The Capolago congress, a meeting to establish an Italian anarchist federation, was held in Capolago, Switzerland, from January 4–6, 1891.

Events 

The Capolago congress took place in Capolago, Switzerland, from January 4–6, 1891. The meeting had previously been announced with an invitation for socialists of all kinds under a later date and different location to distract the authorities. It was the first Italian anarchist gathering since the 1876 Florence Congress of the First International's Italian Federation.
The Capolago congress inaugurated the Partito Socialista-anarchico-rivoluzionario as the anarchists established a common strategy, which the participants considered a reflection of the 1872 St. Imier Congress platform.

The January Capolago congress put passed a resolution to celebrate, propagandize, and endorse a general strike for May Day.

Legacy 

Historian Nunzio Pernicone described the congress as the movement's highest point since the First International's heyday.

References

Bibliography 

 
 
 

January 1891 events
Anarchism in Italy
Political congresses
1891 conferences
1891 in politics
1891 in Italy